The 2018–19 McNeese State Cowgirls basketball team will represent McNeese State University during the 2018–19 NCAA Division I women's basketball season. The Cowgirls, led by third year head coach Kacie Cryer, will play all their home games at the Health and Human Performance Education Complex. They were members of the Southland Conference. They finished the season 7–22, 5–13 in Southland play to finish in a tie for tenth place. They failed to qualify for the Southland women's tournament.

Previous season
The Cowgirls finished the 2017–18 season with a 12–18 overall record and an 8–10 Southland Conference record to finish in eighth place. Their season ended with a loss to Texas A&M–Corpus Christi in the first round of the Southland women's tournament.

Roster

Schedule

|-
!colspan=9 style=| Non-conference regular season

|-
!colspan=9 style=| Southland regular season

See also
2018–19 McNeese State Cowboys basketball team

References

McNeese Cowgirls basketball seasons
McNeese State
McNeese State
McNeese State